Dipteris conjugata is a species of fern (in the family Dipteridaceae). It has a rhizome, and 2-3 tall stems with mid green or dark green fronds, which have several divisions to toothed lobes. It is grows in clearings, mountain ridges and in forest margins, from tropical and temperate Asia, northern Queensland in Australia and some islands in the Pacific Ocean. It has limited native medicinal uses.

Description
It has a creeping rhizome, covered with black shiny hairs, or reddish brown hairlike scales. The hairs are 4 to 5 mm long and 0.2 mm in diam. The hairs are more like bristles on the older sections of the rhizomes. It is up to 1 cm or more in diameter.

They have hair-like scales at base, which then becomes smooth and glabrous. They are stramineous (straw coloured) to brown. 

The leaf stems appear at regular intervals along the rhizome. and branch three or four times, (these rhizomes are usually terrestrial, but can also climb trees). The fronds, or laminae ( are composed of two enormous leaflets, each up to 1 metre wide and broad>

They are divided to the base into two spreading fan-shaped halves, which are further divided more than halfway into 4 or more unequal lobes, these lobes are again less deeply lobed once or more times. The ultimate lobes taper to a narrow apex with the edges deeply or coarsely toothed. The main veins are dichotomously branched several times. The veins on the fronds are also dichotomously-branched with 2–4 main veins entering each of the lobes. The juvenile fronds are tomentose (with a layer of downy hairs).

On the lower surface of the fronds, are numerous, small sori (spore producers), they are irregularly scattered and of irregular size and shape. They do not have indusia (umbrella-like covers) and have paraphyses (filament-like support structures) which are club-shaped.

Biochemistry
The leaves contain 2 ent-kauranoid hydroxy acids.

Taxonomy

In Fijian, it is known as koukoutangane, or 'aivuiniveli'. In Thailand it is called bua chaek and bua cek in Singapore,

It is written as 双扇蕨 or 破傘蕨, in Chinese script, and known as shuang shan jue in Pinyin in China.

The Latin specific epithet conjugata refers to the leaf having one pair of leaflets.

It was described by Caspar Georg Carl Reinwardt in Syll. Pl. Nov. 2: 3 in 1828.

Dipteris conjugata was also published by Tardieu & C.Chr., Fl. Indo-Chine 7(2): 442. 1941; Holttum, Rev. Fl. Malaya ed. 1, 2: 135, f. 55. 1955 [‘1954’]; Tagawa & K.Iwats., SouthE. Asian Stud. 5: 46. 1967; Acta Phytbtax. Geobot. 23: 52. 1968; Tagawa & K.Iwats., Fl. Thailand 3: 481, f. 49.1 & 49.2. 1989; Boonkerd & Pollawatn and Pterid. Thailand: 32, 78. 2000.

Distribution and habitat

It is native to tropical and temperate Asia, Australia and some islands in the Pacific Ocean.

Range
It can be found in temperate Asia, within the Ryukyu Islands of Japan. In tropical Asia, within Papua New Guinea, Cambodia (mainly Kampot), Singapore, Thailand, Vietnam, and Hainan (in China), Taiwan, India, Indonesia, Malaysia (including on the slopes of Mount Ophir,) and in the Philippines. Also within Queensland in Australia, and on the islands of New Caledonia, (of New Zealand) and Fiji.

Within Thailand, it is found in the provinces of Surat Thani, Phangnga, Nakhon Si Thammarat, Trang and Yala. Within Singapore, it is found in the district of Kranji, Tanjung Gul and on the island of Pulau Tekong.

Habitat
D. conjugata grows on clay slopes, in clearings, ridges and on forest margins. In East Kalimantan, Indonesia, it grows along rivers together with Nypa Palms. In Borneo, it is found commonly growing with Histiopteris incisa (Thunb.) J. Sm. and Lygodium circinnatum (Burm.) Sw., along forest margins and paths. In New Caledonia, it is found on sunny roadside banks. The fern is also common in forest margins in high rainfall areas.

In Singapore, it occurs on coastal cliffs, and at the risk of landslides. It is also

Conservation
Dipteris conjugata is listed as Critically Endangered, in the 2008 Singapore Red Data Book. In Labrador Nature Reserve in Singapore, a large historic fern population was decimated, when the reserve was downgraded to a nature park to only a few plants left in 2001. It has also been found in Tanjong Berlayar Park in Singapore.

To help conserve this fern, staff from the National Biodiversity Centre regularly check on the growth of the Dipteris in the Western Water Catchment. Using parangs and secateurs, they prune and clear the plants that may damage the fern, such as the invasive weed, Simpuh Air (Dillenia suffruticosa), the Weeping Fig (Ficus benjamina), and the Resam (fern) (Dicranopteris linearis).

Elsewhere in other areas, at has been assessed as Least Concern (LC), as this species is widespread and not under any known threat.

Cultivation

It is sometimes planted as an ornamental plant in Singapore.

It can grown in poor to well drained soils and is mostly disease and pest resistant.

Also specimens of the plant can be found in Cibodas Botanical Garden in West Java of Indonesia, and in the Fernarium of Univerisiti Kebangsaan in Malaysia

Uses
It has been used as a medicinal plant to treat various ailments, such as in southern Thailand, the roots have been collected for used in traditional medicine. In Fiji, it is used to treat male reproductive ailments.

It also has another use, in the highlands of Mindanao in the Philippines, the large fronds are used as an umbrella.

References

Other sources
 de Winter, W. P. & V. B. Amoroso (eds.), 2003. Plant resources of South-East Asia No. 15(2). Cryptogams: Ferns and fern allies. Prosea Foundation, Borgor, Indonesia. 268 pp.
 Hnatiuk, R. J., 1990. Census of Australian vascular plants. Australian Flora and Fauna Series No. 11.
 Holttum, R. E., 1954. Plant life in Malaya. Longmans, Green & Co.. London. 254 pp.
 Holttum, R. E., 1966. A revised flora of Malaya. II Ferns of Malaya. Govt. Printing Office, Singapore (2nd ed.). 653 pp.
 Lim, S., P. Ng, L. Tan & Y. C. Wee, 1994. Rhythm of the sea - The life and times of Labrador beach. School of Science, National Technological University & Department of Botany, National University of Singapore.
 Parris, B. S., R. Khew, R. C. K. Chung, L. G. Saw & E. Soepadmo (eds.), 2010. Flora of Peninsular Malaysia. Series I: Ferns and Lycophytes. Vol. 1. Malayan Forest records No. 48. Forest Research Institute of Malaysia, Kepong. 249 pp.
 Smitinand, T. & K. Larsen, eds. 1970-. Flora of Thailand.
 Wee, Y. C., 2005. Ferns of the tropics. Times Editions-Marshall Cavendish, Singapore. 2nd ed. 190 pp.
 Wee, Y. C. & R. Hale, 2008. The Nature Society (Singapore) and the struggle to conserve Singapore's nature areas. Nature in Singapore 1: 41-49.

External links

Gleicheniales
Flora of Japan
Flora of tropical Asia
Flora of China
Flora of Taiwan
Flora of New Zealand
Flora of Fiji
Garden plants of Asia
Plants described in 1753
Taxa named by Carl Linnaeus